

Early history

Native Americans had been inhabiting the area that is today known as Cary for thousands of years prior to the arrival of Europeans. When the English colonists arrived in the Piedmont region of North Carolina, they encountered the Sissipahaw, Eno, and Shakori. Little knowledge remains of these people, but it is believed that their numbers were greatly reduced due to smallpox epidemics and military conflicts with settlers. It is assumed that they were absorbed by the Catawba people, who still live in North Carolina and South Carolina.

As settlers began moving westward from the coast of the Carolinas, the area that is known as Cary today was deeded to Francis Jones in 1749. Due to its proximity between the burgeoning towns of New Bern and Hillsborough, Cary began to thrive as a small farming community growing a range of crops including tobacco and cotton. In the late 18th and early 19th century, Cary started becoming more centralized by capitalizing off its location on a crossroads. In 1794, John Bradford built a successful inn known as Bradford's Ordinary, which was what the region was usually referred to at the time. Nathaniel Jones established the Nancy Jones House in 1803, named after his daughter in law, Nancy Ann Jones. Nancy and Henry Jones ran a stagecoach stop and tavern that was well known in North Carolina with visits from numerous notable figures such as Edward B Dudley and James K Polk. The House was also briefly bivouacked by Union General William T. Sherman in 1864.

Cary's role as a crossroad increased with the establishment of the University of North Carolina at nearby Chapel Hill in 1789 and Raleigh as the capital of the state in 1792. But it was the expansion of the North Carolina Railroad in 1854 and the Chatham Railroad in 1868 that really accelerated the town's development. Seeing the potential of the transportation infrastructure, a man named Francis Page bought 300 acres that stretched on both sides of the track. Expanding the economic base of the town, Page built a lumber mill as well as the town's post office, hotel, and school known as the Cary Academy. This period represents Cary's first economic boom, which ended with the Panic of 1873. Page was also the man who first started referring to the area as Cary, naming it after noted prohibitionist Samuel Cary, which was eventually incorporated in 1871. Due to the town's inspiration, Cary was a dry town that did not allow the sale of alcohol.

20th century
Cary's reputation for a well developed school system began in 1907 when the Cary Academy was purchased by the state of North Carolina and Wake County Board of Education. The institution was renamed Cary High School and became one of the first public high schools in North Carolina. The town's dedication to education was shown through a special tax used to help construct a new school building and establish a high school program that trained other teachers. As chairman of the school board, renowned Dr. J.M. Templeton connected education with Cary's agriculture base by establishing a vocational technology program and a 15-acre farm run by the high school. A product of this agrarian tradition was one of Cary's most famous farms, the Kildare Dairy. Encompassing over 1,000 acres, this farm had over 10,000 laying hens and 550 head of cattle.

Following World War I, Cary became quickly modernized with the entire town becoming electrified in 1921. The construction of the Western Wake Highway made traveling to Raleigh much easier and quicker, which started the trend of people commuting to Raleigh for work. As the town grew 64% during the 1920s, Cary started a tradition of constructing subdivisions and transitioning from well water to sewer systems. During this time, Cary saw the construction of its largest building, a Masonic Lodge, which is now a drugstore.

Like many towns and cities throughout the United States, the Great Depression adversely affected the population. The Bank of Cary, which had been founded in 1921, closed down. The town went bankrupt in 1932. However, due to the efforts of Franklin Roosevelt's New Deal, several areas of Cary were conserved as green space. For example, the William B. Umstead State Park was created by the CCC by repurposing abandoned farmland along the Crabtree Creek.

Suburban development 
The period after World War II saw the greatest growth and development for the town of Cary, which led to the creation of the Planning and Zoning Board in 1949. All the streets in Cary were paved by the early 1950s. Many residential suburbs began forming around the downtown area including Veteran Hills, Russell Hills, and Montclair subdivisions. Even the first supermarket in 1950 (a Piggly Wiggly) was an example of the shifting trends in Cary development during the post-War period.

With the creation of the Research Triangle Park in 1959, Cary's population doubled by the 1960s. To deal with the problem of overcrowding in schools, several new schools were constructed in the 1960s. Originally built to segregate African Americans and white students, Cary became the first school system in Wake County to integrate their schools in 1963. Another social change that happened during this time was the legalization of the sale of alcohol in 1964.

Another way in which Cary dealt with the rapid growth of the town in the 1960s was through adopting subdivision regulations in 1961 and updating zoning ordinances and their land use plan in 1963. The town's economic base also expanded with the development of many stores in the downtown and the arrival of IBM and other major corporations. In the early 1960s, Cary connected with Raleigh's sewer and water systems to improve the quality and help with in the increased volume and had their own sewer system by the 1980s.

In the 1970s, the people of Cary became concerned with how its rapid growth was impacting its small-town character. From a city planning perspective, their solution was to utilize Planned Unit Developments (PUD). The first PUD was the conversion of the Kildare Dairy Farm in 1971, which had been suffering economically. The 967-acre project was estimated to accommodate approximately 2,950 families. The PUD model became so popular in Cary that 22 more were created between 1980 and 1992. Another method to preserve the small-town feel of Cary was the formation of the Community Appearance Commission in 1972, which focused on regulating the look of downtown through sign ordinances. Additionally, through the Land Dedication Ordinance of 1974, more green space was protected by requiring developers to set aside one acre of green space for every 35 housing units constructed. During the 1980s, Cary created Industrial Performance Districts, which increased the town's tax base by encouraging businesses to build within the town's limits.

While growth has slowed after 1980s, the population reached its peaked in 2010 with a population of 135,000. The land area of the town has increased to 42 square miles from its original one square mile in the 1870s.

References

Cary, North Carolina
Cary